Hallig Hooge is a 1923 German silent film directed by Carl Froelich and starring Dora Bergner, Evi Eva and Willy Fritsch.

The film's sets were designed by Botho Hoefer.

Cast
In alphabetical order
 Dora Bergner as Britta  
 Evi Eva as Eike  
 Willy Fritsch as Tetze Tetens  
 Werner Funck as Ow Erkel - Lehrer  
 Fritz Kampers as Marne Rieckmers  
 Viggo Larsen as Holm von Thümen  
 Clementine Plessner as Stine  
 Claire Reigbert as Trine  
 Ludwig Rex 
 Eva Seeberg as Jutta von Este  
 Lotte Spira as Elga von Hohenhorst  
 Hella Thornegg 
 Hans Tillo as Frithjo

References

Bibliography
 Hans-Michael Bock and Tim Bergfelder. The Concise Cinegraph: An Encyclopedia of German Cinema. Berghahn Books.

External links

1923 films
Films of the Weimar Republic
Films directed by Carl Froelich
German silent feature films
Films set on islands
German black-and-white films